Melvyn C. Goldstein (born February 8, 1938) is an American social anthropologist and Tibet scholar. He is a professor of anthropology at Case Western Reserve University and a member of the National Academy of Sciences.

His research focuses on Tibetan society, history and contemporary politics, population studies, polyandry, studies in cultural and development ecology, economic change and cross-cultural gerontology.

Education and career

Goldstein was born in New York City on February 8, 1938. Goldstein obtained a BA with a major in history in 1959, and an MA in history in 1960 from the University of Michigan. He pursued his research in anthropology at the University of Washington and was awarded a PhD in 1968. In 1968, he joined the faculty of the Department of Anthropology at Case Western Reserve University as an assistant professor. He became an associate professor in 1974 and full Professor in 1978. From 1975 to 2002 he was the Chairman of the Department of Anthropology. Between 1987 and 1991 he was the Director of the Center for Research on Tibet, and is still the co-director. From 1991 he has been the Professor (on secondary appointment) of the International Health, School of Medicine. He was elected to the U.S. National Academy of Sciences (Section 51, Anthropology) in 2009.

Research
Goldstein has conducted research in different parts of Tibet (mainly in the Tibet Autonomous Region of China) on a range of topics including nomadic pastoralism, the impact of reforms on rural Tibet, family planning and fertility, modern Tibetan history, and socio-economic change. He has also conducted research in India (with Tibetan refugees in Bylakuppe), in northwest Nepal (with a Tibetan border community in Limi), in western Mongolia (with a nomadic pastoral community in Khovd Province) and in inland China (with Han Chinese on modernization and the elderly).

Goldstein and Cynthia Beall were the first Western anthropologists to conduct extensive field research in Tibet when they stayed for 16 months between June 1986 and June 1988. Part of their research from that trip included 10 months living with a community of Tibetan nomads, which was published in the book Nomads of Western Tibet: The Survival of a Way of Life and described by Per Kvaerne as "the first anthropological survey of a community in present-day Tibet".

His later projects include: an oral history of Tibet, Volume Three (1955–57) of his four-volume History of Modern Tibet series, and a longitudinal study of the impact of China's reform policies on rural Tibet (nomads and farmers). He completed an NSF study investigating modernization and changing patterns of intergenerational relations in rural Tibet from 2005 to 2007.

Reception
Goldstein's History of Modern Tibet series was described as "decades of groundbreaking scholarship on the society and history of Central Tibet" by historian Benno Weiner. His work portrays pre-1950 Tibet as "de facto independent" as well as a feudal theocracy. The first volume in the series, A History of Modern Tibet, 1913-1951: The Demise of the Lamaist State, was awarded Honorable Mention for the Joseph Levenson Book Prize in 1989 by the Association for Asian Studies. The second volume was described by historian A. Tom Grunfeld as "an extraordinarily detailed and nuanced history".

Colin Mackerras labeled Goldstein as "well known in the field of Tibetan studies" and described his book On the Cultural Revolution in Tibet: The Nyemo Incident of 1969 with Ben Jiao and Tanzen Lhundrup an "extraordinary book" and "excellent history".

Honours and recognition

The Frank and Dorothy Hummel Hovorka Prize, Case Western Reserve University, in 2012
Elected Member, National Academy of Sciences, Section 51, Anthropology, in 2009
The Association for Asian Studies's Joseph Levenson Book Prize, Honorable Mention, 1989
Member, National Committee on United States-China Relations, 1997 to present

Personal life
Goldstein married the daughter of the Tibetan scholar-official-aristocrat, Surkhang Wangchen Gelek.

Goldstein collects bonsai trees.

Selected publications

Books 
A History of Modern Tibet, Volume 1: 1913-1951: The Demise of the Lamaist State. University of California Press. 1989, 
 The Snow Lion and the Dragon: China, Tibet and the Dalai Lama, University of California Press, 1997.
 (with William Siebenschuh, and Tashi Tsering), The Struggle for Modern Tibet: The Autobiography of Tashi Tsering, Armonk, NY: M.E.Sharpe, Inc. 1997.
 Chinese Edition of The Struggle for a Modern Tibet: the Life of Tashi Tsering, Mirror Books, Carle Place, NY., 2000.
 A New Tibetan English Dictionary of Modern Tibetan, University of California Press, Pp. 1200, 2001.
 (with Dawei Sherap, William Siebenschuh), A Tibetan Revolutionary. The Political Life of Bapa Phüntso Wangye, University of California Press, 2004.
 A History of Modern Tibet, Volume 2: The Calm Before the Storm: 1951-1955, University of California Press, 2007, .
 (with Ben Jiao, Tanzen Lhundrup), On the Cultural Revolution in Tibet: The Nyemo Incident of 1969, University of California Press, 2009, .
 A History of Modern Tibet, Volume 3: The Storm Clouds Descend, 1955–1957, University of California Press, 2013, .
 A History of Modern Tibet, Volume 4: In the Eye of the Storm, 1957-1959, University of California Press, 2019, .

Journal articles 
 "Stratification, Polyandry and Family Structure in Tibet," in Southwestern Journal of Anthropology 27, No. 1: 64–74, 1971.
 "Serfdom and Mobility: An Examination of the Institution of "Human Lease" in Traditional Tibetan Society," in The Journal of Asian Studies, May 1971, vol. 30, issue 3, pp. 521-534.
"Fraternal Polyandry and Fertility in a High Himalayan Valley in Northwest Nepal," in Human Ecology, Vol. 4, No. 3, pp. 223–233, 1976.
"Pahari and Tibetan Polyandry Revisited," in Ethnology, 17(3): 325–347, 1978.
(with P. Tsarong), "Tibetan Buddhist Monasticism: Social, Psychological and Cultural Implications," in The Tibet Journal, 10(1): 14–31, 1985.
"Re-examining Choice, Dependency and Command in the Tibetan Social System. "Tax Appendages" and Other Landless Serfs," in The Tibet Journal, vol. XI, No 4, 1986, pp. 79-112.
"When Brothers Share a Wife," in Natural History, March 1987.
"On the Nature of Tibetan Peasantry," in The Tibet Journal, vol. XIII, No 1, 1988, pp. 61–65.
"Freedom, Servitude and the "Servant Serf" Nyima," in The Tibet Journal, vol. XIV, No 2, 1989, pp. 56-60.
(with Cynthia M. Beall), "China's Birth Control Policy in the Tibet Autonomous Region," in Asian Survey, vol. 31, No 3, 1991, pp. 286–303.
"The Dalai Lama's Dilemma," in Foreign Affairs, vol. 77, No. 1, January/February 1998.
(with Ben Jiao, Cynthia M. Beall & Phuntso Tsering), "Fertility & Family Planning in Rural Tibet," in The China Journal, Issue 1, 2002.
(with G. Childs, Phujung Wangdui), "Beijing's 'People First' development initiative for the Tibet Autonomous Region's rural sector – a case study from the Shigatse area," in The China Journal, 2010, Vol. 63, pp. 59–78.
(with Cynthia M. Beall), "Changing patterns of Tibetan nomadic pastoralism," In Human Biology of Pastoral Populations, Leonard and Crawford (eds.), Cambridge University Press, pp. 131–150.

Book chapters 
"Adjudication and Partition in the Tibetan Stem Family," in D. Buxbaum (ed.), Chinese Family Law and Social Change, University of Washington Press, 1978.
"The Revival of Monastic Life in Drepung Monastery," in Goldstein and Kapstein (eds.), Buddhism in Contemporary Tibet: Religious Revival & Cultural Identity, pp. 16–52, 1998a.
"Introduction," in Goldstein and Kapstein (eds.), Buddhism in Contemporary Tibet: Religious Revival & Cultural Identity, pp. 1–15, 1998b.
(with Cynthia M. Beall), "Changing patterns of Tibetan nomadic pastoralism," in Human Biology of Pastoral Populations, Leonard and Crawford (eds.), Cambridge University Press, pp. 131–150.
"Tibetan Buddhism and Mass Monasticism," in Des moines et des moniales dans le monde. La vie monastique dans le miroir de la parenté (ss la dir. de Adeline Herrou et Gisele Krauskopff), Presses universitaires de Toulouse-le Mirail, 2010.

Special report 
Tibet, China and the United States: Reflections on the Tibet Question, Occasional Paper Series, The Atlantic Council of the United States, April 1995, 89 p.

Editorship 
(with Matthew Kapstein (eds.)), Buddhism in Contemporary Tibet: Religious Revival and Cultural Identity, University of California Press, 1998.

Online:
 The Remote World of Tibet's Nomads
 The Impact of China's Reform Policy on the Nomads of Western Tibet
 Change and Continuity in Nomadic Pastoralism on the Western Tibetan Plateau
 Nomads of Golok, a Report
 A Report on Limi Panchayat, Humla District, Karnali Zone
 When Brothers Share a Wife, from Natural History, March, 1987, pp. 39-48 (on Tibetan polyandry)

References

Citations

Sources

External links
 Melvyn Goldstein at the Center for Research on Tibet
Books at Amazon
Page at Case Western Reserve University
Profile at The Wenner-Gren Foundation
Author profile at Vivlio
  (in which Melvyn Goldstein provides commentary)

American anthropologists
Case Western Reserve University faculty
Tibetologists
University of Michigan College of Literature, Science, and the Arts alumni
University of Washington College of Arts and Sciences alumni
1938 births
Living people
Jewish anthropologists
Members of the United States National Academy of Sciences